Thespinae is a subfamily of mantises in the family Thespidae. There are 16 genera and at least 40 described species: found in  Australasia, Central and South America.

Genera
The following genera are recognised in the subfamily Thespinae:
Tribe Oligonychini
 Subtribe Oligonychina
 Bistanta Anderson, 2018
 Galapagia Scudder, 1893
 Liguanea Rehn & Hebard, 1938
 Oligonicella Giglio-Tos, 1915
 Oligonyx Saussure, 1869
 Piscomantis Rivera & Vergara-Cobián
 Thesprotia Stal, 1877
 Subtribe Pogonogasterina
 Carrikerella Hebard, 1921
 Pogonogaster Rehn, 1918
 Thesprotiella Giglio-Tos, 1915
Tribe Thespini
 Macromusonia Hebard, 1922
 Musonia Stal, 1877
 Musoniola Giglio-Tos, 1917
 Paramusonia Rehn, 1904
 Pseudomusonia Werner, 1909
 Thespis'' Serville, 1831

References

Further reading

 
 
 
 

Thespidae
Mantodea subfamilies